Macaria aemulataria, the common angle moth, is a moth in the  family Geometridae. The species was first described by Francis Walker in 1861. It is found from Nova Scotia to Florida, west to Texas, north to Oregon and Alberta.

The forewings are cream-grey with three transverse lines and a bold brown patch in the middle outer third. The hindwings have a discal spot and antemedian and postmedian lines. Adults are on wing from mid-June to mid-July in Alberta and from May to September in Ohio.

The larvae feed on Acer species.

References

Moths described in 1861
Macariini